Filband (also Romanized as Fīlband) is a village in bandpey district, Babol County, Mazandaran Province, Iran. At the 2006 census, its population was 8, in 4 families.

This village is located at an altitude of about 2,300 metres above sea level. Filband on the eastern side of Mazandaran is known as the roof of the province.

In this village, winter begins very soon and ends late.

The combination of high mountains and dense forests which pass through a large amount of white clouds has turned the village into a beautiful tourist destination.

The skies of Filband open up hidden and new aspects of nature to the tourists in the tranquillity of the clouds and the silence of nature.

References 

Populated places in Babol County
Tourist attractions in Babol